Arthur Rogers may refer to:

 Arthur M. Rogers (1860–1939), member of the Wisconsin State Assembly
 Arthur William Rogers (1872–1946), British and South African geologist
 Arthur Rogers (footballer) (born 1996), English footballer